T Levels are technical-based qualifications in England, developed in collaboration with employers and businesses, with content that meets the needs of industry and prepares students for work, further training, or study.

T Levels are two-year courses that can be studied by 16-18 year olds after finishing their GCSEs. T Levels are based on the same standards as apprenticeships, designed by employers and approved by the Institute for Apprenticeships and Technical Education. They are the responsibility of the Parliamentary Under-Secretary of State for Apprenticeships and Skills in the Department for Education.

History
The concept of a unified technical qualification with equal status to A-levels was first raised in a government-commissioned review by Lord Sainsbury. This major education change was announced by the Chancellor of the Exchequer Philip Hammond, in his budget statement in 2017. The proposal was tentatively welcomed by professionals. In September 2020 there were 193 colleges planning to offer some T Levels by 2022. The first qualifications were awarded in August 2022.

Proposal
The aim of the new T Levels is to improve the teaching and administration of technical education which will enable students to directly enter employment on completion of a programme in further education or sixth form. These qualifications will be a mix of theoretical work learnt in the classroom in a Further Education (FE)` College or in a sixth form in a secondary school and two industry practical placements with local employers working in partnership with the college or sixth form. The T Levels will be a Level 3 qualification on the Regulated Qualifications Framework.

Students can expect to gain
 a broad knowledge; with skills and behaviours necessary for employment in an occupation or industry related to their field of study
 an opportunity to develop specialist technical skills relevant to at least one occupation
 the relevant English, Maths, Science and Digital skills.

Students can expect to be taught the core subjects of English, Maths, Science and Digital skills. This will be classroom based. They will learn as well the specialised skills necessary to embark in a career in their chosen field, spending 80% of the overall course in the classroom and the other 20% in a "meaningful industry placement", offering training and 45 days of work experience. It has already been decided that the total programme time for the course should be over 1900 hours.

Reaction

The Universities and Colleges Admissions Service (UCAS) has said that the highest T Level qualification, a starred distinction, will be worth the equivalent of three A*s at A Level when a student is being considered for a place in higher education, giving them 168 UCAS points; the highest A Level result is worth 56 points.

Pathways
As announced in 2017, it is envisaged that there will be 15 pathways:
 
Agriculture, Environmental and Animal Care
Business and Administrative
Catering and Hospitality
Childcare and Education
Construction
Creative and Design
Digital
Engineering and Manufacturing
Hair and Beauty
Health and Science
Legal, Finance and Accounting
Protective Services
Sales, Marketing and Procurement
Social Care
Transport and Logistics

Within these pathways there are multiple specific courses.

Digital, construction, education and childcare courses were launched in September 2020, and Health and Science courses in September 2021.

As of September 2021, the following T Levels are available:
 Building Services Engineering for Construction
 Design, Surveying and Planning for Construction
 Digital Business Services
 Digital Production, Design and Development
 Digital Support Services
 Education and Childcare
 Health
 Healthcare Science
 Onsite Construction
 Science

References

External links
College locator

Educational qualifications in the United Kingdom
School examinations